"Be Quiet" is a song by American rapper Pitbull, released on October 31, 2006 as the fourth official single from his second studio album, El Mariel (2006). This song was produced by Shakespeare.

Track listing
Digital download

"Be Quiet" – 3:22

Credits and personnel
Armando C. Perez – songwriter
Shakespeare - producer

Source:

Release history

References

2006 songs
2006 singles
Pitbull (rapper) songs
TVT Records singles